The Ruhr Ship Canal, or Ruhrschifffahrtskanal in German, is a canal in the German state of North Rhine-Westphalia. It links the River Rhine at Duisburg to the city of Mülheim an der Ruhr.

Canals in Germany
Buildings and structures in Duisburg
Transport in Duisburg
Mülheim
Federal waterways in Germany
Canals opened in 1927